The Fargo Kid is a 1940 American Western film directed by Edward Killy starring Tim Holt. It was the second in Holt's series of Westerns for RKO. The film was shot in Kanab Canyon, Cave Lakes, and Johnson Canyon.

The script was based on a story which had been previously filmed as Man in the Rough (1928) and The Cheyenne Kid (1935).

Plot summary
A cowpuncher is mistaken for a notorious gunman.

Cast
 Tim Holt as The Fargo Kid
 Ray Whitley as Johnny
 Emmett Lynn as Whopper
 Jane Drummond as Jenny Winters
 Cy Kendall as Nick Kane
 Ernie Adams as Bush Cleveland
 Paul Fix as Deuce Mallory
 Paul Scardon as Caleb Winters
 Glenn Strange as Sheriff Dave
 Mary MacLaren as Mrs. Sarah Winters

Production
Filming took place from August 8–30.

Soundtrack
 Ray Whitley's combo – "Crazy Ole Trails Ahead" (Music and lyrics by Ray Whitley and Fred Rose)
 Ray Whitley's combo – "Twilight on the Prairie" (Music and lyrics by Ray Whitley and Fred Rose)
 "Echo in the Night" (Music and lyrics by Ray Whitley and Fred Rose)

References

External links
 
 
 
 
 

1940 films
American black-and-white films
1940 Western (genre) films
American Western (genre) films
RKO Pictures films
Films shot in Utah
Films directed by Edward Killy
Films produced by Bert Gilroy
1940s English-language films
1940s American films